Swansea College was a further education college in Swansea. It was one of the largest further education colleges in Wales with over 15,000 students and employing approximately 1,000 staff. Swansea College merged with Gorseinon College on 20 August 2010 to create a single sixth form and further education college for the Swansea area called Gower College Swansea.

Swansea College provided preparation for a number of qualifications, including GCSEs, the IB Diploma Programme, A-levels and HNDs, as well as a number of vocational courses leading to BTEC First and National Diplomas, NVQs and other similar qualifications. It also ran EFL programmes for non-native speakers of English.

The College's mission statement was: We will provide high quality, relevant provision for all our learners.

Campus and catchment area
The College operated on several different sites in Swansea.
 Tycoch Campus – Sketty: Main site of the College, provided A level, IB and all Vocational Courses ranging from NVQs to BTEC awards.
Llwyn-Y-Bryn – Uplands: Site for visual and performing arts.
Kingsway Centre – city centre
Business College – Llansamlet
Several other sites, including Sketty Hall and local schools, were used for courses.

Faculties and services

A Level and the arts
The faculty was split into two areas – a specially designed 'B Floor' at the College's Tycoch campus and purpose-built Arts, Media and Performance suites at Llwyn y Bryn. The faculty provided preparation for a number of qualifications, including A-levels, the IB and HNDs, as well as a number of vocational courses leading to BTEC First and National Diplomas, NVQs and other similar qualifications.

2008 results
 99.3% of students passed their A Level courses.
 15% of these had A grades, 47% A or B and 78% A, B or C.
 93% of students passed their AS Level courses.
 100% of students passed the International Baccalaureate Diploma.

Sport, lifestyle and business
Extra curricular opportunities were offered, including work experience, educational visits, visiting speakers and entrepreneurship guidance. Courses were designed to provide the student with the knowledge and skills to progress into employment or Higher Education in sport, leisure, tourism, business, hospitality or public services.

The faculty also housed the Centre for Sporting Development which is dedicated to the physical, personal and intellectual development of student athletes.

Engineering, IT and technology
These courses were designed to provide students with a choice of routes into a range of disciplines for either Higher Education or employment. They gave the student a chance to develop the skills, knowledge and understanding that underpin the creation of Engineering and IT systems and services.

The faculty had fully equipped workrooms as well as specialist computer software.

Social and vocational studies
Students of hairdressing, beauty and complementary therapy could take part in work experience in a salon environment at either its Broadway or Cefn Hengoed Centre. Health and social care courses were also offered.

Community operations
Community Operations worked closely with partner organisations in Swansea to help to coordinate basic skills and adult community courses throughout the city. Opportunities were on offer to help people improve their employability by encouraging confidence and developing skills for life.

Training for business
The Business College was the commercial arm of Swansea College. Many programmes carried national accreditation. Others were bespoke, tailored to the student's particular needs. The Business College was based in Swansea Vale and offers training courses such as NEBOSH, IOSH, CIEH, BIIAB, OCR, RTITB, CMI, ILM, First Aid and NVQ.

Work-based learning
Swansea College offered modern apprenticeships throughout the year. There are different levels of apprenticeships available and on successful completion students are awarded with a nationally recognised Modern Apprenticeship framework.

Levels included:
Foundation Modern Apprentice (NVQ Level 2) 
Advanced Modern Apprentice (NVQ Level 3/4) 
Modern Skills Diploma (NVQ Level 4/5)

Results and awards
In 2008, the College's pass rates were:

Level 3 courses
 99.3% on A Level Courses.
 88% on National Diploma Courses
 80% on National Certificate Courses
 90% on NVQ Level 3 programmes
 100% on the International Baccalaureate Diploma

Level 2 courses
 93% at GCSE
 91% at First Diploma level
 91% on NVQ Level 2 programmes

Others
 95% on Level One GNVQ Foundation Courses
 92% on Introductory Courses

Awards
The College won the LSDA Beacon Award (for Staff Development in ILT) in 1999-2000.

History
The original Swansea College was built in 1825 and was situated near the Swansea Dock area. This building also housed the guildhall, law courts and juvenile centre after being rebuilt in 1848. From 1960, the building was solely used as a college of further education, housing 700 students. After rapid expansion, the college relocated to a new site in Tycoch in 1971.

The further education corporation with the name of "Swansea College" was established by the Education (Further Education Corporations) Order 1992 (S.I. 1992/2097)

Swansea College merged with Gorseinon College on 20 August 2010 to create a single sixth form and further education college for the Swansea area called Gower College Swansea.

References

External links
Swansea College profile on Studyfinder.org

Further education colleges in Swansea
International Baccalaureate schools in Wales